is the chairman and CEO of Canon inc. He studied law at Chuo University, and was President of Canon in the USA until 1989.

Mitarai used a unique blend of eastern and western managerial styles to mold Canon into a highly successful company. Through a large overhaul he was able to bring the company back to profitability with a style that was coined "the Mitarai way."

Career
In 1961, Fujio Mitarai joined Canon, training as an accountant. Mitarai was sent to the US to help Canon develop in the camera market. Upon arrival he discovered a financial disaster. He discovered that only $6,000 had been made on sales of $3 million. The auditors that advised Mitarai told him Canon should close its US operations and put the money in the bank as it would make more money off the interest. However, he chose to ignore their advice and take on the challenge of turning the company around.

Mitarai noticed that Canon's US division was drastically inefficient especially when it came to their corporate structure. When Mitarai  took an in-depth look at the company's corporate structure, he noticed that the different divisions within the company became so independent that they only thought about what would benefit their division, not the entire company. The lack of communication between divisions was astounding and it got to the point where divisions would be building separate factories in China at the same time. This kind of inefficiencies cost Canon dearly and in certain instances it would cost the company twice as much to do something. This was due to the fact that different branches would plan separately instead of together which would have allowed them to combine their costs.

However, Mitarai didn't just overhaul the company's corporate structure. He was also responsible for launching several new Canon products, notably the Canon AE-1 35mm SLR camera that allowed amateur photographers to take high quality photos. These cameras helped Canon get to the top of the camera market and helped the company build the reputation that it possesses today. In 1984 Mitarai struck a deal with Hewlett-Packard (HP) to produce photocopiers using HP software and Canon laser printing. In 1989 Mitarai returned to Japan and found that several of the company's divisions were in the red, however he was unable to do anything about it until 1995 when he was made CEO. He began to shut down unprofitable divisions within the company and turned the focus of the company from sales to profits, and rewarded Canon's best performing staff. In Mitarai's quest to generate profits he also began to provide performance incentives to his managers. And in turn, the company's devoted managers contributed even more to the company's bottom line.

References

1935 births
Living people
Canon (company) people